David Curtis "Steve" Stephenson (August 21, 1891 – June 28, 1966) was an American Ku Klux Klan (KKK) leader, convicted rapist and murderer. In 1923 he was appointed Grand Dragon of the Indiana Klan and head of Klan recruiting for seven other states. Later that year, he led those groups to independence from the national KKK organization. Amassing wealth and political power in Indiana politics, he was one of the most prominent national Klan leaders. "He was viewed as responsible for reviving the Klan and widening its base, and considered the most powerful man in Indiana". He had close relationships with numerous Indiana politicians, especially Governor Edward L. Jackson.

In Stephenson v. State (1925) Stephenson was tried for and convicted of the abduction, rape, and murder of Madge Oberholtzer, a state education official. His trial, conviction and imprisonment was a severe blow to the public perception of Klan leaders as law abiding. The case destroyed the Klan as a political force in Indiana, and significantly damaged its standing nationally. Denied a pardon by Governor Jackson, in 1927 he started talking with reporters for the Indianapolis Times and released a list of elected and other officials who had been in the pay of the Klan. This led to a wave of indictments in Indiana, more national scandals, the rapid loss of tens of thousands of members, and the end of the second wave of Klan activity in the late 1920s.

Stephenson's burial in USVA Mountain Home National Cemetery in Johnson City, Tennessee led to Congress passing restrictions barring serious sex offenders or those convicted of capital crimes from burial in veterans' cemeteries.

Early life and education 
Stephenson was born in Houston, Texas on August 21, 1891, and moved as a child with his family to Maysville, Oklahoma. After some public schooling, he started work as a printer's apprentice.

During World War I, he enlisted in the Army and completed officers' training. He never served overseas, but his training proved useful when he organized and led groups.

Klansman 

In 1920 at the age of 29, he moved to Evansville, Indiana, where he worked for a retail coal company. He joined the Democratic Party and in 1922, ran unsuccessfully for a Democratic Congressional nomination. He was said to have already "married and abandoned two wives" before settling in Evansville.

Joseph M. Huffington, whom the Ku Klux Klan had sent from Texas as an agent for organizing in Evansville, recruited Stephenson to the group's inner circle. The historian Leonard Moore characterized them as both young men on the make. The Evansville Klavern became the most powerful in the state, and Stephenson soon contributed to attracting numerous new members. More than 5,400 men, or 23 percent of the native-born white men in Vanderburgh County, ultimately joined the Klan.

Building on the momentum, Stephenson set up a base in Indianapolis, where he helped create the Klan's state newspaper, Fiery Cross. He quickly recruited new agents and organizers, building on news about the organization. Protestant ministers were offered free membership. From July 1922 to July 1923, nearly 2,000 new members joined the Klan each week in Indiana. Hiram Wesley Evans, who led recruiting for the national organization, maintained close ties to state leaders throughout 1921–1922 and he was especially close to Stephenson, because by then, Indiana had the largest state Klan organization. Stephenson backed Evans in November 1922 when he unseated William J. Simmons as Imperial Wizard of the national KKK. Evans had ambitions to make the Klan a political force in the country.

After Evans won, he officially appointed Stephenson as Grand Dragon of Indiana.  Privately he made him head of recruiting for seven other states north of Mississippi. In the 1920s, Klan membership grew dramatically in these states. In Indiana, membership grew to nearly 250,000 or about one third of all white males in the state. Stephenson acquired great wealth and political power by leading the Klan; agents received a portion of fees paid by new recruits, and he began to wield other powers. Evans, who had a monopoly on the sale of Klan uniforms and paraphernalia, appointed Stephenson as Grand Dragon of the Indiana Klan at a 1923 Fourth of July gathering of the Klan in Kokomo, Indiana, with more than 100,000 members and their families in attendance. Stephenson said,

My worthy subjects, citizens of the Invisible Empire, Klansmen all, greetings. It grieves me to be late. The President of the United States kept me unduly long counseling on matters of state. Only my plea that this is the time and the place of my coronation obtained for me surcease from his prayers for guidance.

Evans and Stephenson's relationship quickly deteriorated. Evans responded by attempting to remove Stephenson as Grand Dragon in 1923 but Stephenson refused to step down.  Encouraged by his success, in September 1923, Stephenson severed his ties with the existing national organization of the KKK, and formed a rival KKK that was made up of the chapters which he led. To bolster his legitimacy, Stephenson realigned with William Joseph Simmons and the original leaders of the national organization that had been ousted by Evans in 1922. That year Stephenson changed his affiliation from the Democratic to the Republican Party, which was predominant in Indiana and much of the Midwest. He supported Republican Edward L. Jackson, who was rumored to be a Klan member, when Jackson ran successfully for governor in 1924. Stephenson once claimed, "I am the law in Indiana."

Shortly after, on May 12, 1924, at an assembly in the Cadle Tabernacle in Indianapolis, he said:"God help the man who issues a proclamation of war against the Klan in Indiana now ... We are going to Klux Indiana as she has never been Kluxed before ... I'll appeal to the ministers of Indiana to do the praying for the Ku Klux Klan and I'll do the scrapping for it ... And the fiery cross is going to burn at every crossroads in Indiana, as long as there is a white man left in the state."

Convicted of murder 
Publicly a Prohibitionist and a defender of "Protestant womanhood," Stephenson was tried in 1925 for the rape and murder of Madge Oberholtzer, a young state employee who ran a state program to combat adult illiteracy. During the trial, the Klan's image as upholders of law and morality was gravely weakened as it was proven that Stephenson and many of his associates were in private womanizers and alcoholics. The scandal of the charges and trial led to the rapid decline in  the "Second Wave" of Klan activity. Stephenson was convicted of the abduction, forced intoxication, and rape of Oberholtzer. His abuse led to her suicide attempt while she was still in his captivity. Because the suicide attempt eventually caused Oberholtzer's death, Stephenson was also charged with murder.

Stephenson had bitten her many times during his attack, and witnesses said it appeared as if she had been "chewed by a cannibal." The attending doctor described her condition included a very significant bite on her breast.  He later testified that the bite wounds which Stephenson inflicted on her were the leading contributor to her death due to a staph infection that eventually reached her lungs. The doctor also testified that she could have been saved if she had been given medical attention sooner. In her dying declaration, Oberholtzer claimed that Stephenson had refused to give her medical attention unless she agreed to marry him first.  The jury convicted Stephenson of second-degree murder on November 14, 1925, on its first ballot. Stephenson was sentenced to life in prison on November 16, 1925.

After his conviction, Governor Edward L. Jackson refused to grant Stephenson clemency or commute his sentence. On September 9, 1927, Stephenson released lists of public officials who were or had been on the Klan payroll. The Indianapolis Times interviewed Stephenson and proceeded with an extended investigation of the Klan's political ties. (The Times won a Pulitzer Prize for Public Service for its investigative reporting.) This publicity and the state's crackdown on Klan activity sped up the decline of the organization by the end of the 1920s. The KKK suffered a dramatic nationwide loss of reputation and its membership rapidly fell from 5 million in 1925; few Klan members were counted in the organization's former Midwestern stronghold soon after.

The state filed indictments against Governor Jackson; George V. "Cap" Coffin, chairman of the Marion County Republican Party; and attorney Robert I. Marsh, charging them with conspiring to bribe former Governor Warren McCray. The mayor of Indianapolis, John Duvall, was convicted and sentenced to jail for 30 days (and barred from political service for four years). Some Republican commissioners of Marion County resigned from their posts after being charged with accepting bribes from the Klan and Stephenson.

Later years 
On January 7, 1941, the Valparaiso Vidette-Messenger reported that Governor M. Clifford Townsend, a Democrat, was considering granting an early parole to Stephenson. No parole was approved that year. Stephenson was paroled on March 23, 1950, by a Democratic administration, but violated parole by disappearing on or before September 25, 1950. On December 15, 1950, he was captured in Minneapolis, Minnesota and returned to custody. He was sentenced in 1951 to serve 10 years in prison. In 1953, he pleaded for release, denying that he had been a leader of the Klan.  On December 22, 1956, the state paroled him on condition that he leave Indiana and never return. Stephenson moved to Seymour, Indiana, where he soon married Martha Dickinson. They were separated in 1962 when he left and never returned. 

Stephenson then moved to Jonesborough, Tennessee (briefly spelled as Jonesboro during this time), where he was employed at the Herald & Tribune newspaper, and where he married Martha Murray Sutton without having been divorced from Dickinson.

In 1961, at the age of 70, Stephenson was arrested in Independence, Missouri on charges of attempting to sexually assault a 16-year-old girl but he was released after paying a $300 fine because the charges were dropped on grounds of insufficient evidence. He was ordered to leave Missouri immediately. A few years later, in 1966, Stephenson died at his home in Jonesborough, Tennessee, and as an honorably discharged veteran was buried at the USVA Mountain Home National Cemetery in Johnson City, Tennessee. Congress later passed restrictions barring serious sex offenders or those convicted of capital crimes from burial in veterans' cemeteries.

His legal wife Martha Dickinson petitioned for and was granted a divorce in Jackson County Circuit Court in Brownstown in 1971, not knowing that Stephenson had remarried and died in 1966.

Cultural references 
John Heard portrayed Stephenson in the television miniseries Cross of Fire (1989).
In Daniel Easterman's alternate history novel K is for Killing (1997), Stephenson is featured as the sinister power behind the throne after the isolationist Senator Charles Lindbergh is elected President of the United States. Easterman reflected the documented predatory sexual behavior of Stephenson in the novel. He was portrayed as a politically savvy but unstable ally of Adolf Hitler.

See also 
Indiana Klan

References

Further reading 
 Egan, Timothy.  "A Fever in the Heartland" (Penguin Random House, 2023)
 Leibowitz, Irving. My Indiana (Prentice Hall Inc., 1964)
 Lutholtz, M. William. Grand Dragon: DC Stephenson and the Ku Klux Klan in Indiana (Purdue University Press, 1991).
 Madison, James H. Hoosiers: A New History of Indiana (2014) pp 242–253.
 Moore, Leonard J. Citizen Klansmen: The Ku Klux Klan in Indiana, 1921–1928 (University of North Carolina Press, 1997).
 Pegram, Thomas R. One Hundred Percent American: The Rebirth and Decline of the Ku Klux Klan in the 1920s (2011)

 Smith, Ron F. "The Klan's Retribution Against an Indiana Editor: A Reconsideration."  Indiana Magazine of History 106#4 (2010): 381–400.

External links 
"Indiana and the Ku Klux Klan", Center for History
Lindsay Dunn, The Stephenson Trial: Internal Klan Conflicts Linked to Downfall of Second Klan in Indiana, Columbia University
"D.C. Stephenson Collection, 1922-1978" Collection Guide, Indiana Historical Society, accessed 2012-10-19.
"D. C. Stephenson Trial (1925)" Doug Linder, 2010. University of Missouri-Kansas City (UMKC) School of Law.
""Murder Wasn't Very Pretty": The Rise and Fall of D.C. Stephenson" Karen Abbott. smithsonian.com, August 30, 2012. Retrieved November 21, 2017.

1891 births
1966 deaths
American people convicted of murder
American people convicted of rape
American people convicted of kidnapping
American politicians convicted of sex offences
American prisoners sentenced to life imprisonment
Indiana Democrats
Indiana politicians convicted of crimes
Ku Klux Klan Grand Dragons
People from Houston
People from Maysville, Oklahoma
People paroled from life sentence
Politicians convicted of murder
People convicted of murder by Indiana
Prisoners sentenced to life imprisonment by Indiana
Indiana Republicans
People from Jonesborough, Tennessee
Child sexual abuse in the United States
Ku Klux Klan in Indiana